Gelsenkirchen-Rotthausen is a railway station on the Essen–Gelsenkirchen railway situated in Gelsenkirchen in western Germany. It is classified by Deutsche Bahn as a category 6 station. It is served by Rhine-Ruhr S-Bahn line S 2 and by bus route 381 (Gelsenkirchen – Erle – Resse/Buer) operated by BOGESTRA.

References 

Railway stations in North Rhine-Westphalia
S2 (Rhine-Ruhr S-Bahn)
Rhine-Ruhr S-Bahn stations
Buildings and structures in Gelsenkirchen
Railway stations in Germany opened in 1876